These are the results of the men's C-1 1000 metres competition in canoeing at the 1936 Summer Olympics.  The C-1 event is raced by single-man sprint canoes and took place on Saturday, August 8.

Six canoeists from six nations competed.

Competition format
With only six competitors in the event, a final was held.

Results

Final

References
1936 Summer Olympics Official Report Volume 2. p. 1024.
Sports reference.com 1936 C-1 1000 m results.

Men's C-1 1000